The Detroit River Light, also known as Bar Point Shoal Light, was first established as a lightship in 1875. The current sparkplug lighthouse was built in 1885. Its original 4th order Fresnel lens is on loan to the Michigan Maritime Museum.

Construction and infrastructure
The Detroit River Light replaced a Canadian lightship that had been posted in this channel location since 1875, guiding upbound vessels making a turn in the Detroit River.

The United States Lighthouse Board completed the Detroit River Light in 1885 at a cost of $78,000.  The light was first lit on August 20, 1885.

The crib was transported to the site from Amherstburg, Ontario. The light station pier is shaped like a vessel. Its pointed end is directed toward the mouth of the river to break river-powered ice floes. There is an attached storage building and radio beacon.

Challenges in construction
Construction was eventful and problematic. As winter was approaching and work set to stop, 550 short tons of stone were loaded onto the pier, "mostly on the high side." Upon the crews return the following spring, gravity and ice floes had made the granite pier level.

Operational history
Detroit River Light was constructed to be a manned lighthouse.  Coast Guardsmen assigned to this close-but-eerily-isolated station used to refer to it as "The Rock."  The light is now automated.

With Prohibition the light served as a rendezvous point for rum runners.  The nearby city of Windsor was a noted point for the distillation of Canadian whiskey, much of which was exported to the U.S.

The light today
In December 1997 the  freighter  struck the station dead on (a "direct hit") as it sailed down bound for Lake Erie. The station suffered minimal damage to rock and stone foundation.  The freighter had its steel bow pushed "in like a tin can" with a  gash.

The lens has been changed several times, and this has altered the characteristic signal generated by the light to passing boats and ships. The present lens has six panels of 60 degrees, with three bull's-eye panels each separated from the other by a 60 degree blind panel.

The station contains a fog signal, similar to Harbor Beach Light (also built in 1885). The station is an active aid to navigation, is closed to visitors, and visible only from a boat.  A good launch point is the south end of the island of Grosse Ile, Michigan.

It was added to the National Register of Historic Places as Detroit River Light Station on August 4, 1983, reference number 83000886.

The light has been memorialized in sculptures.

Keepers
Charles Northup (1885–1886 and 1893–1898)
Richard Oddrey (1887–1890)
Joseph Crawford (1898–1902)
Enoch Scribner (1902–1912)
Horace Watts (1912–1916)
Walter Marshall (1916–1919)
Harry K Condway (1919–1921)
John Sweet (1926–1933)
William Small (1933–1938)
Eli Martin (1938–1939)

References

Further reading
 Greenwood, Tom, Detroit River Light (September, 1998)  Lighthouse Digest.
 Nolan, Jenny, How the Detroit River shaped lives and history (February 11, 1997), Detroit News.

External links
Aerial photo of Detroit River Lighthouse at marinas.com.
Satellite view of Detroit River (Bar Point Shoal) Lighthouse at Google Maps.
Colchester Reef Light (Lake Erie, West)

Lighthouses completed in 1884
Houses completed in 1884
Lighthouses on the National Register of Historic Places in Michigan
Michigan State Historic Sites
Buildings and structures in Monroe County, Michigan
Transportation in Monroe County, Michigan
National Register of Historic Places in Monroe County, Michigan
1884 establishments in Michigan